Our Swan Song is the debut 2006 release from Laura Jean. "I'm a Rabbit, I'm a Fox" and "A Good Thing" were released as radio singles and achieved high rotation on Triple J. The album had a reissue release on September 1, 2007 when Jean changed record labels.

Track listing

"The Hunter's Ode" (Laura Jean) - 4:16
"The Mid-Way" (Jean) - 4:14
"A Good Thing" (Jean) - 3:54
"I Don't Know" (Jean) - 3:14
"The Ferry" (Jean) - 3:19
"I'm a Rabbit, I'm a Fox" (Jean) - 3:53
"It's Supposed to be Summer" (Jean) - 4:07
"Paradise Lost" (Jean) - 4:32
"Happiness" (Jean) - 4:53
"Solace" (Jean) - 4:16
"Our Swan Song" (Jean) - 3:33

Credits
Laura Jean - Vocals, guitar, percussion, piano, backing vocals
Biddy Connor - Electric guitar
Ian Downie - Guitar
Alex Miller - Double bass, contrabass
Simon Grounds - Bass troll
Erica Englert - Backing vocals
Bruno Siketa - Trumpet
Rob Shirley - Horn
Erin McNamara - Trombone
Shannon Barnett - Trombone
Adam Greene - Tuba
Zachary Johnston - Violin
Elizabeth Donellan - Violin
Phoebe Green - Viola
Cally Tromans - Violoncello
Sam Dunscombe - Clarinet
Michael Powell - Oboe
Adam Mikulicz - Bassoon
Amelia Coleman - Oboe
Linda Pearson - Bassoon

Laura Jean albums
2006 debut albums